The 2015–16 Baylor Lady Bears basketball team will represent Baylor University in the 2015–16 NCAA Division I women's basketball season. Returning as head coach was Hall of Famer Kim Mulkey for her 15th season. The team plays its home games at the Ferrell Center in Waco, Texas and are members of the Big 12 Conference. They finish the season 33–4, 16–2 in Big 12 to win the Big 12 regular season title. They also won the Big 12 Women's Tournament to earn an automatic trip to the NCAA women's tournament where they defeated Idaho and Auburn in the first and second rounds, Florida State in the sweet sixteen before losing to Oregon State in the elite eight.

Roster

Rankings
2015–16 NCAA Division I women's basketball rankings

Schedule

|-
! colspan=9 style="background:#004834; color:#FECB00;"| Exhibition

|-
!colspan=9 style="background:#004834; color:#FECB00;"| Non-conference regular season

|-
!colspan=9 style="background:#004834; color:#FECB00;"| Big 12 regular season

|-
!colspan=9 style="background:#004834; color:#FDBB2F;" | Big 12 Women's Tournament

|-
!colspan=9 style="background:#004834; color:#FDBB2F;" | NCAA Women's Tournament

Source

See also
 2015–16 Baylor Bears basketball team

References

Baylor Bears women's basketball seasons
Baylor
Baylor